The arrondissement of Verdun is an arrondissement of France in the Meuse department in the Grand Est region. It has 254 communes. The six communes in the Arrondissement was never inhabited.

Composition

The communes of the arrondissement of Verdun, and their INSEE codes, are:

 Abaucourt-Hautecourt (55002)
 Aincreville (55004)
 Ambly-sur-Meuse (55007)
 Amel-sur-l'Étang (55008)
 Ancemont (55009)
 Arrancy-sur-Crusnes (55013)
 Aubréville (55014)
 Autréville-Saint-Lambert (55018)
 Avillers-Sainte-Croix (55021)
 Avioth (55022)
 Avocourt (55023)
 Azannes-et-Soumazannes (55024)
 Baâlon (55025)
 Bantheville (55028)
 Baulny (55033)
 Bazeilles-sur-Othain (55034)
 Beauclair (55036)
 Beaufort-en-Argonne (55037)
 Beaumont-en-Verdunois (55039)
 Belleray (55042)
 Belleville-sur-Meuse (55043)
 Belrupt-en-Verdunois (55045)
 Béthelainville (55047)
 Béthincourt (55048)
 Bezonvaux (55050)
 Billy-sous-Mangiennes (55053)
 Blanzée (55055)
 Boinville-en-Woëvre (55057)
 Bonzée (55060)
 Bouligny (55063)
 Boureuilles (55065)
 Brabant-en-Argonne (55068)
 Brabant-sur-Meuse (55070)
 Brandeville (55071)
 Braquis (55072)
 Bras-sur-Meuse (55073)
 Bréhéville (55076)
 Breux (55077)
 Brieulles-sur-Meuse (55078)
 Brocourt-en-Argonne (55082)
 Brouennes (55083)
 Buzy-Darmont (55094)
 Cesse (55095)
 Champneuville (55099)
 Charny-sur-Meuse (55102)
 Charpentry (55103)
 Chattancourt (55106)
 Chaumont-devant-Damvillers (55107)
 Chauvency-Saint-Hubert (55110)
 Chauvency-le-Château (55109)
 Cheppy (55113)
 Châtillon-sous-les-Côtes (55105)
 Cierges-sous-Montfaucon (55115)
 Le Claon (55116)
 Clermont-en-Argonne (55117)
 Cléry-le-Grand (55118)
 Cléry-le-Petit (55119)
 Combres-sous-les-Côtes (55121)
 Consenvoye (55124)
 Cuisy (55137)
 Cumières-le-Mort-Homme (55139)
 Cunel (55140)
 Damloup (55143)
 Damvillers (55145)
 Dannevoux (55146)
 Delut (55149)
 Dieppe-sous-Douaumont (55153)
 Dieue-sur-Meuse (55154)
 Dombasle-en-Argonne (55155)
 Dombras (55156)
 Dommartin-la-Montagne (55157)
 Dommary-Baroncourt (55158)
 Domremy-la-Canne (55162)
 Doncourt-aux-Templiers (55163)
 Douaumont-Vaux (55537)
 Doulcon (55165)
 Dugny-sur-Meuse (55166)
 Dun-sur-Meuse (55167)
 Duzey (55168)
 Écouviez (55169)
 Écurey-en-Verdunois (55170)
 Eix (55171)
 Les Éparges (55172)
 Épinonville (55174)
 Esnes-en-Argonne (55180)
 Étain (55181)
 Éton (55182)
 Étraye (55183)
 Flassigny (55188)
 Fleury-devant-Douaumont (55189)
 Foameix-Ornel (55191)
 Fontaines-Saint-Clair (55192)
 Forges-sur-Meuse (55193)
 Fresnes-en-Woëvre (55198)
 Froidos (55199)
 Fromeréville-les-Vallons (55200)
 Fromezey (55201)
 Futeau (55202)
 Gercourt-et-Drillancourt (55206)
 Gesnes-en-Argonne (55208)
 Gincrey (55211)
 Gouraincourt (55216)
 Gremilly (55218)
 Grimaucourt-en-Woëvre (55219)
 Gussainville (55222)
 Génicourt-sur-Meuse (55204)
 Halles-sous-les-Côtes (55225)
 Han-lès-Juvigny (55226)
 Hannonville-sous-les-Côtes (55228)
 Harville (55232)
 Haudainville (55236)
 Haudiomont (55237)
 Haumont-près-Samogneux (55239)
 Heippes (55241)
 Hennemont (55242)
 Herbeuville (55243)
 Herméville-en-Woëvre (55244)
 Les Islettes (55253)
 Inor (55250)
 Iré-le-Sec (55252)
 Jametz (55255)
 Jouy-en-Argonne (55257)
 Julvécourt (55260)
 Juvigny-sur-Loison (55262)
 Labeuville (55265)
 Lachalade (55266)
 Lamouilly (55275)
 Landrecourt-Lempire (55276)
 Laneuville-sur-Meuse (55279)
 Lanhères (55280)
 Latour-en-Woëvre (55281)
 Lemmes (55286)
 Liny-devant-Dun (55292)
 Lion-devant-Dun (55293)
 Lissey (55297)
 Loison (55299)
 Louppy-sur-Loison (55306)
 Louvemont-Côte-du-Poivre (55307)
 Luzy-Saint-Martin (55310)
 Maizeray (55311)
 Malancourt (55313)
 Mangiennes (55316)
 Manheulles (55317)
 Marchéville-en-Woëvre (55320)
 Marre (55321)
 Martincourt-sur-Meuse (55323)
 Marville (55324)
 Maucourt-sur-Orne (55325)
 Merles-sur-Loison (55336)
 Milly-sur-Bradon (55338)
 Mogeville (55339)
 Moirey-Flabas-Crépion (55341)
 Mont-devant-Sassey (55345)
 Montblainville (55343)
 Montfaucon-d'Argonne (55346)
 Les Monthairons (55347)
 Montigny-devant-Sassey (55349)
 Montmédy (55351)
 Montzéville (55355)
 Moranville (55356)
 Morgemoulin (55357)
 Mouilly (55360)
 Moulainville (55361)
 Moulins-Saint-Hubert (55362)
 Moulotte (55363)
 Mouzay (55364)
 Murvaux (55365)
 Muzeray (55367)
 Nantillois (55375)
 Nepvant (55377)
 Le Neufour (55379)
 Neuvilly-en-Argonne (55383)
 Nixéville-Blercourt (55385)
 Nouillonpont (55387)
 Olizy-sur-Chiers (55391)
 Ornes (55394)
 Osches (55395)
 Pareid (55399)
 Parfondrupt (55400)
 Peuvillers (55403)
 Pillon (55405)
 Pintheville (55406)
 Pouilly-sur-Meuse (55408)
 Quincy-Landzécourt (55410)
 Rambluzin-et-Benoite-Vaux (55411)
 Rarécourt (55416)
 Récicourt (55419)
 Récourt-le-Creux (55420)
 Regnéville-sur-Meuse (55422)
 Remoiville (55425)
 Réville-aux-Bois (55428)
 Riaville (55429)
 Romagne-sous-Montfaucon (55438)
 Romagne-sous-les-Côtes (55437)
 Ronvaux (55439)
 Rouvres-en-Woëvre (55443)
 Rouvrois-sur-Othain (55445)
 Rupt-en-Woëvre (55449)
 Rupt-sur-Othain (55450)
 Saint-André-en-Barrois (55453)
 Saint-Hilaire-en-Woëvre (55457)
 Saint-Jean-lès-Buzy (55458)
 Saint-Laurent-sur-Othain (55461)
 Saint-Pierrevillers (55464)
 Saint-Remy-la-Calonne (55465)
 Samogneux (55468)
 Sassey-sur-Meuse (55469)
 Saulmory-Villefranche (55471)
 Saulx-lès-Champlon (55473)
 Senon (55481)
 Senoncourt-lès-Maujouy (55482)
 Septsarges (55484)
 Sivry-la-Perche (55489)
 Sivry-sur-Meuse (55490)
 Sommedieue (55492)
 Sorbey (55495)
 Les Souhesmes-Rampont (55497)
 Souilly (55498)
 Spincourt (55500)
 Stenay (55502)
 Thierville-sur-Meuse (55505)
 Thillot (55507)
 Thonne-la-Long (55508)
 Thonne-le-Thil (55509)
 Thonne-les-Près (55510)
 Thonnelle (55511)
 Tilly-sur-Meuse (55512)
 Trésauvaux (55515)
 Vacherauville (55523)
 Vadelaincourt (55525)
 Varennes-en-Argonne (55527)
 Vaudoncourt (55535)
 Vauquois (55536)
 Velosnes (55544)
 Verdun (55545)
 Verneuil-Grand (55546)
 Verneuil-Petit (55547)
 Véry (55549)
 Vigneul-sous-Montmédy (55552)
 Ville-devant-Chaumont (55556)
 Ville-en-Woëvre (55557)
 Ville-sur-Cousances (55567)
 Villers-devant-Dun (55561)
 Villers-lès-Mangiennes (55563)
 Villers-sous-Pareid (55565)
 Villers-sur-Meuse (55566)
 Villécloye (55554)
 Vilosnes-Haraumont (55571)
 Vittarville (55572)
 Warcq (55578)
 Watronville (55579)
 Wavrille (55580)
 Wiseppe (55582)
 Woël (55583)

History

The arrondissement of Verdun was created in 1800.

As a result of the reorganisation of the cantons of France which came into effect in 2015, the borders of the cantons are no longer related to the borders of the arrondissements. The cantons of the arrondissement of Verdun were, as of January 2015:

 Charny-sur-Meuse
 Clermont-en-Argonne
 Damvillers
 Dun-sur-Meuse
 Étain
 Fresnes-en-Woëvre
 Montfaucon-d'Argonne
 Montmédy
 Souilly
 Spincourt
 Stenay
 Varennes-en-Argonne
 Verdun-Centre
 Verdun-Est
 Verdun-Ouest

References

Verdun